Providence Industrial Mission (PIM) was an independent church in Nyasaland, modern-day Malawi. The PIM was founded by John Chilembwe, who would later lead a rebellion against colonial rule, upon his return to Nyasaland in 1900 from the United States, where he had been studying in a Baptist seminary. PIM continues today to operate in conjunction with the Foreign Mission Board of the National Baptist Convention, USA, Inc.

The PIM served as the focal point of the 1915 Chilembwe uprising. In the aftermath of the uprising, the government shut the PIM down and either executed or imprisoned most of its leaders. The government demolished its main church, the New Jerusalem Baptist Church, after recapturing the village of Mbombwe in which it was situated. The PIM remained closed until 1926, when it reopened under the leadership of former student Daniel Sharpe Malekebu. Malekebu led the PIM until 1971, for a total of 45 years. Learnard Muocha took over as Chairman between 1971 and 1987.

References

Baptist Christianity in Malawi
1900s in Nyasaland
1910s in Nyasaland
British Central Africa Protectorate
Nyasaland
Chilembwe uprising
Christian organizations established in 1900
1900 establishments in the British Empire
1900s establishments in Nyasaland